Peter McConville (born 17 August 1958) is a former Australian rules footballer who played with Carlton and St Kilda in the VFL.

Life and career
McConville was twenty when he made his debut for Carlton in the 1978 season and he started his career well, managing 38 goals in the season. He played in a variety of positions over the years and was a member of Carlton premiership teams in 1979, 1981 and 1982. In 1986 he crossed to St Kilda where he played out his career.

External links

1958 births
Living people
Australian rules footballers from Victoria (Australia)
Carlton Football Club players
Carlton Football Club Premiership players
St Kilda Football Club players
Golden Square Football Club players
Victorian State of Origin players
Three-time VFL/AFL Premiership players